WAFL (97.7 MHz) is an FM radio station broadcasting a Top 40 format. Licensed to Milford, Delaware, United States, the station serves the Dover, Delaware area.  The station is currently owned by Forever Media. The station is also broadcast on HD radio.

History
The station first went on the air as WAFL-FM on May 19, 1973, under the ownership of Thomas H. Draper, who would go on to purchase WBOC-TV.

The station originally broadcast a country format with the tagline of "The Country King". After that, the station changed its format to an adult contemporary format and became WAFL - Great Hits.

In September 1994, WAFL shifted to the then-groundbreaking hot adult contemporary format as Eagle 97.7. Recently, Eagle 97.7 has shifted to a Top 40 format, focusing on current and recent hits.

References

External links

AFL
1973 establishments in Delaware